The Inbal Jerusalem Hotel is a luxury  5 Star hotel in the Talbiya neighborhood of Jerusalem.

History

Originally known as the Laromme, the hotel was designed by architect Yaakov Rechter. It opened in 1982 on a tract of land adjacent to Liberty Bell Park owned by one of the churches in Jerusalem and leased by the Jerusalem Municipality. The original plan was to build a 20-story hotel, but neighborhood protests led to a low-rise design.

Notable guests 

Notable guests include Bill Clinton, Al Gore, Henry Kissinger,  George Mitchell, Condoleezza Rice, Mikhail Gorbachev, Madeleine Albright and Dennis B. Ross.

See also
Architecture of Israel

References

Hotels in Jerusalem
Hotel buildings completed in 1982
1982 establishments in Israel
Architecture in Israel
Yaakov Rechter buildings
Talbiya